The following list of Arkansas companies includes notable companies that are, or once were, headquartered in Arkansas.

Companies based in Arkansas

A
 ABF Freight System
 Alliance Rubber Company
 ArcBest Corporation
 Arvest Bank

D
 Dillard's

J
 J. B. Hunt

M
 Mountain Valley Spring Water
 Murphy Oil

R
 Ranger Boats
 Riceland Foods

S
 Sam's Club
 Shake's Frozen Custard
 Stephens Inc.

T
 Tyson Foods

W
 Walmart
 Windstream Holdings

Companies formerly based in Arkansas

A
 AmTran

F
 FedEx

L
 Lion Oil
 LiveRamp

U
 USA Drug

Y
 Yarnell Ice Cream Co.

References

Arkansas

Arkansas-related lists